The Central European Free Trade Agreement (CEFTA) is an international trade agreement between countries mostly located in Southeastern Europe. Founded by representatives of Poland, Hungary and Czechoslovakia, CEFTA expanded to Albania, Bosnia and Herzegovina, Bulgaria, Croatia, Moldova, Montenegro, North Macedonia, Romania, Serbia, Slovenia and the UNMIK (on behalf of Kosovo, in accordance with UNSCR 1244).

Members 
As of 1 July 2013, the parties of the CEFTA agreement are: Albania, Bosnia and Herzegovina,  Moldova, Montenegro, North Macedonia, Serbia, and UNMIK (on behalf of Kosovo).

Former parties are Bulgaria, Croatia, Czech Republic, Hungary, Poland, Romania, Slovakia, and Slovenia. Their CEFTA memberships ended when they became member states of the European Union (EU).

Membership criteria 

Former Poznań Declaration criteria:
 World Trade Organization membership
 European Union Association Agreement with provisions for future full membership
 Free Trade Agreements with the current CEFTA member states

Current criteria since Zagreb meeting in 2005:
 WTO membership or commitment to respect all WTO regulations
 any European Union Association Agreement
 Free Trade Agreements with the current CEFTA member states

Current members

History

Original agreement
The original CEFTA agreement was signed by the Visegrád Group countries, that is by Poland, Hungary and Czechia and Slovakia (at the time parts of the Czechoslovakia) on 21 December 1992 in Kraków, Poland. It came into force in July 1994. Through CEFTA, participating countries hoped to mobilize efforts to integrate into Western European institutions and through this, to join European political, economic, security and legal systems, thereby consolidating democracy and free-market economics.

The agreement was amended by the agreements signed on 11 September 1995 in Brno and on 4 July 2003 in Bled.

Slovenia joined CEFTA in 1996, Romania in 1997, Bulgaria in 1999, Croatia in 2003 and Macedonia in 2006.

2006 agreement
All of the parties of the original agreement had now joined the EU and thus left CEFTA. Therefore, it was decided to extend CEFTA to cover the rest of the Balkan states, which already had completed a matrix of bilateral free trade agreements in the framework of the Stability Pact for South Eastern Europe. On 6 April 2006, at the South East Europe Prime Ministers Summit in Bucharest, a joint declaration on expansion of CEFTA to Albania, Bosnia and Herzegovina, Moldova, Serbia, Montenegro and UNMIK (on behalf of Kosovo) was adopted. Accession of Ukraine has also been discussed. The new enlarged agreement was initialled on 9 November 2006 in Brussels and was signed on 19 December 2006 at the South East European Prime Ministers Summit in Bucharest. The agreement went into effect on 26 July 2007 for Albania, Kosovo, Moldova, Montenegro and Macedonia, on 22 August for Croatia, on 24 October for Serbia, and on 22 November 2007 for Bosnia and Herzegovina. The aim of the agreement was to establish a free trade zone in the region by 31 December 2010.

After the declaration of independence of Kosovo on 17 February 2008 UNMIK continued to represent Kosovo at all CEFTA meetings. At the end of 2008 Kosovo changed its customs stamps replacing UNMIK with Kosovo. This resulted in a trade blockade from Serbia and Bosnia that do not recognise the Republic of Kosovo. The government in Pristina retaliated by imposing its own blockade on imports from Serbia. This led to clashes at border posts in July 2011.

Relations with the European Union 
All former participating countries had previously signed association agreements with the EU, so in fact CEFTA has served as a preparation for full European Union membership. Poland, the Czech Republic, Hungary, Slovakia, Slovenia joined the EU on 1 May 2004, with Bulgaria and Romania following suit on 1 January 2007. Croatia joined the EU on 1 July 2013.

Montenegro, Serbia, Albania, and North Macedonia have been undergoing EU accession talks since 2012, 2014 and 2022.

At the EU's recommendation, the future members prepared for membership by establishing free trade areas. A large proportion of CEFTA foreign trade is with EU countries.

See also 
Economy of Europe
Free trade areas in Europe
Mini-Schengen area
European Free Trade Association (EFTA)
Stability Pact for South Eastern Europe (includes an array of bilateral FTAs)
Mercosur
Southeast Europe Transport Community
Rules of origin
Market access
Free-trade area
Tariffs

Notes

References

External links 

Market Access Map (A free tool developed by International Trade Centre, which identify customs tariffs, tariff rate quotas, trade remedies, regulatory requirements and preferential regimes applicable to products, including CEFTA)
Rules of Origin Facilitator (A free tool jointly developed by International Trade Centre, World Trade Organization and World Customs Organization which enables traders to find specific criteria and general origin requirements applicable to their products, understand and comply with them in order to be eligible for preferential tariffs. The tool is very useful for traders who want to gain benefit from CEFTA)
 
CEFTA Trade Portal
Original CEFTA Treaty
CEFTA 2006 Agreement
Central European Free Trade Agreement (CEFTA) page on the Rules of Origin Facilitator, with member countries' status and access to legal documents.

International organizations based in Europe
Trade blocs
Treaties concluded in 1992
Treaties of Poland
Treaties of Czechoslovakia
Treaties of Slovenia
Treaties of Serbia
Treaties of Romania
Treaties of North Macedonia
Treaties of Moldova
Treaties of Montenegro
Treaties of Bosnia and Herzegovina
Treaties of the Czech Republic
Treaties of Slovakia
Treaties of Kosovo
Treaties of Hungary
Treaties of Bulgaria
Free trade agreements of Serbia
Treaties of Croatia
Treaties of Albania
Czechoslovakia–Poland relations
Czechoslovakia–Hungary relations
European integration